Frankenhardt is a rural Gemeinde (municipality) in the district of Schwäbisch Hall in Baden-Württemberg in Germany. It consists of thirty-nine villages, hamlets and other settlements. The largest village is Oberspeltach, followed by Gründelhardt.  The township lies about twenty kilometres east of the town of Schwäbisch Hall.

The township was created in 1975 by the merger of the townships of Gründelhardt and Honhardt with the recently incorporated Oberspeltach municipality.

References

Schwäbisch Hall (district)
Württemberg